Deutsch-Wagram is a city in Austria.

Wagram may also refer to:

Places
 Wagram, North Carolina, United States
 Wagram, Ohio, United States
 Wagram, Poland

Other
 Wagram (Paris Métro), a station of the Paris Métro
 Battle of Wagram (1809), a battle in the War of the Fifth Coalition, part of the Napoleonic Wars
 French ship Wagram (1810), a French navy 118-gun Océan-class ship of the line
 French ship Wagram (1854), a French navy 100-gun Hercule-class ship of the line
 Princes of Wagram, a title of Napoleonic nobility
 Wagram Music, a French record label